Rocket landing pad may refer to:

 Floating landing platform, a water-borne landing platform for a rocket 
 SpaceX landing zone, a type of facility for landing SpaceX rockets
 SpaceX Landing Complex 1, a SpaceX multi-pad landing facility on the Space Coast, Florida, United States
 SpaceX Landing Zone 1, a SpaceX landing pad on the Space Coast, Florida, United States
 SpaceX Landing Zone 2, a SpaceX landing pad on the Space Coast, Florida, United States
 SpaceX Landing Zone 4, a SpaceX landing pad in Vandenberg AFB, California, United States

See also
 Autonomous spaceport drone ship (ASDS)
 Landing pad (disambiguation)
 Landing zone (disambiguation)